Fire Station No. 9 may refer to:
 Fire Station No. 9 (Terre Haute, Indiana), listed on the National Register of Historic Places (NRHP)
 Fire Station No. 9 (Kansas City, Kansas), NRHP-listed
Fire Engine House No. 9, Houston, Texas, NRHP-listed

See also
List of fire stations